Carabus cavernosus cavernosus is a subspecies of black coloured ground beetle in the subfamily Carabinae that can be found in Albania, Bosnia and Herzegovina, Bulgaria, Romania, and everywhere in Yugoslavia (except for Slovenia).

References

cavernosus cavernosus
Beetles described in 1837